The 9th Flak Division was a division of the Luftwaffe created in western France in January 1941. It served on the Eastern Front before being surrounded in Stalingrad in November 1942 and destroyed. The division was reformed in February 1943 in the before Kuban Peninsula, and spent the remainder of the war on the Eastern Front.

Order of battle
The Division consisted of the following units at Stalingrad, under the command of Wolfgang Pickert:
 37th Motorised Flak Regiment
 91st Motorised Flak Regiment
 104th Motorised Flak Regiment
 129th Motorised Signals Battalion

References
 
 

Luftwaffe Divisions
Air defence divisions
Military units and formations established in 1941
Military units and formations disestablished in 1945